Kimpoko is a district within Maluku municipality in the Democratic Republic of the Congo.

Location

Kimpoko is on the northeast shore of the Pool Malebo near where a branch of the Congo River enters the Pool to east of the Îles de Kabongo.

History

In June 1883 Louis-Gustave Amelot was appointed commander of Kimpoko station.
At Kimpoko Amelot got into an argument with a chief and six of his headmen over the rotting carcass of a hippopotamus, which resulted in their being killed.
Soon there were rumors that the post was in danger, and Henry Morton Stanley ordered the complete evacuation of its staff and equipment to Léopoldville.
In 1884 Edde Gleerup was appointed head of the Kimpoko Station at Stanley Pool.
He built a new station there.

A Baptist missionary station was established at Kimpoko in 1886 as a way-station for transportation to the Upper Kasaï region.
The missionaries also had stations at Vivi, Isangila and Manyanga. 
From the  stretch of the river from Isangila to Manyanga they could travel by a launch propelled by oars and sails.
From there they had to walk  to Léopoldville, and from there by oars of steamer  to Kimpoko.

Notes

Sources

Populated places in Kinshasa